Rudy Barbier (born 18 December 1992) is a French cyclist, who currently rides for UCI WorldTeam . He is the brother of fellow racing cyclist Pierre Barbier. In October 2020, he was named in the startlist for the 2020 Giro d'Italia.

Major results

2012
 5th Val d'Ille Classic
2013
 4th Overall Paris–Arras Tour
 1st  Young rider classification
1st Stage 2
 6th Paris–Bourges
 9th Paris–Mantes-en-Yvelines
2014
 2nd Overall Paris–Arras Tour
1st  Young rider classification
1st Stage 1 (TTT)
 2nd Overall Ronde de l'Oise
 5th Overall Tour de Picardie
 8th Grand Prix de Fourmies
 9th Grand Prix Pino Cerami
2015
 1st Stage 1 Circuit des Ardennes
 3rd Grand Prix de Denain
 4th Overall World Ports Classic
1st  Young rider classification
 7th Overall Ronde de l'Oise
 7th La Roue Tourangelle
 7th Grand Prix de la ville de Pérenchies
 9th Overall Tour de Picardie
 9th Paris–Chauny
2016
 1st Paris–Troyes
 1st Cholet-Pays de Loire
 2nd Grand Prix de la ville de Pérenchies
 3rd Paris–Bourges
 4th Gooikse Pijl
 5th Grand Prix de la Somme
 5th Grand Prix d'Isbergues
 7th Polynormande
 7th Tour de Vendée
 9th La Roue Tourangelle
2017
 1st Paris–Bourges
 2nd Grand Prix de la Somme
 4th Omloop Eurometropool
 5th Grand Prix d'Isbergues
 6th Scheldeprijs
 7th Kampioenschap van Vlaanderen
 9th London–Surrey Classic
 10th EuroEyes Cyclassics
2018
 10th London–Surrey Classic
2019
 1st Classic Loire Atlantique
 3rd Overall Tour of Estonia
1st Stage 1
 5th Cholet-Pays de la Loire
 7th Grand Prix de la Somme
 10th Bredene Koksijde Classic
2020
 1st Stage 1 Vuelta a San Juan
 1st Stage 4 Okolo Slovenska
 8th Clásica de Almería
2021
 6th Gooikse Pijl
 10th Nokere Koerse
2022
 5th Elfstedenronde

Grand Tour general classification results timeline

References

External links

1992 births
Living people
French male cyclists
Sportspeople from Beauvais
Cyclists from Hauts-de-France
21st-century French people